"Longshot" is a single by Welsh rock band Catfish and the Bottlemen. It is the lead song off of their third studio album, The Balance. The single was released on 7 January 2019 through Island Records.

Charts

Weekly charts

Year-end charts

Certifications

References

2019 singles
2019 songs
Catfish and the Bottlemen songs
Island Records singles
Song recordings produced by Jacknife Lee